Cherminotus is an extinct genus of monitor lizard from the Late Cretaceous of Mongolia. The type and only species, Cherminotus longifrons, was named in 1984.

Description and history
Cherminotus longifrons was first described in 1984 from the Barun Goyot Formation. More specimens were later found in the Djadokhta Formation in localities such as Ukhaa Tolgod.

Cherminotus is small for a monitor lizard and has a longer snout than its closest relative, the living Earless monitor lizard. Cherminotus is also very similar in appearance to Aiolosaurus, another monitor from the Cretaceous of Mongolia. Both monitors have a single hole in the lacrimal bone called the lacrimal foramen. Other monitors and monitor ancestors have two holes in the lacrimal, making the presence of only one hole in Cherminotus a case of evolutionary reversal.

References

Late Cretaceous lepidosaurs of Asia
Cretaceous lizards
Monitor lizards
Prehistoric reptile genera
Fossil taxa described in 1984